Volkovo is a rural locality (a village) in Abakanovskoye Rural Settlement, Cherepovetsky District, Vologda Oblast, Russia. The population was 5 as of 2002. There are 3 streets.

Geography 
Volkovo is located 33 km northwest of Cherepovets (the district's administrative centre) by road. Sandalovo is the nearest rural locality.

References 

Rural localities in Cherepovetsky District